(born 1976) is a Japanese alpine skier. She competed at the 1998 Winter Olympics in Nagano, and also at the 2002 and 2006 Winter Olympics.

References

1976 births
Living people
Japanese female alpine skiers
Olympic alpine skiers of Japan
Alpine skiers at the 1998 Winter Olympics
Alpine skiers at the 2002 Winter Olympics
Alpine skiers at the 2006 Winter Olympics
21st-century Japanese women